Armenochori (Armenovo; , Armenovo or Арменохор, Armenohor) is a village in the Florina regional unit, northern Greece. It is situated along the Greek National Road 2, 4 km northeast of Florina.

Demographics

In 1845 the Russian slavist Victor Grigorovich recorded Arminor as mainly Bulgarian village. According to the statistics of Geographers Dimitri Mishev and D. M. Brancoff, the town had a total Christian population of 776 in 1905, consisting of 424 Patriarchist Bulgarians (Grecomans) and 352 Exarchist Bulgarians. It also had 2 schools, 1 Bulgarian and 1 Greek.

The Greek census (1920) recorded 871 people in the village and in 1923 there were 40 inhabitants (or 6 families) who were Muslim. Following the Greek-Turkish population exchange, in 1926 within Armenochori there were 36 refugee families from Pontus. The Greek census (1928) recorded 1045 village inhabitants. There were 36 refugee families (151 people) in 1928. 

Armenochori had 1046 inhabitants in 1981. In fieldwork done by Riki Van Boeschoten in late 1993, Armenochori was populated by Slavophones and a Greek population descended from Anatolian Greek refugees who arrived during the Greek-Turkish population exchange. The Macedonian language was spoken in the village by people over 30 in public and private settings. Children understood the language, but mostly did not use it. Pontic Greek was spoken by people over 60, mainly in private.

Culture

In 1990 the Armenochori Cultural Society started collecting objects from folk culture which led to the creation of the Folklore Collection. The collection is housed in the old primary school of Armenochori in the centre of the village. Displayed in the three rooms of the building are objects from folk culture, which come exclusively from the families of Armenochori. There are men's and women's traditional costumes, domestic utensils, various metal, earthenware or wooden objects used in the home, objects relating to cottage industry, the most notable among them being a nineteenth-century loom, farming tools and tools of a number of other occupations, as well as the old pulpit from the village church.

References

Folk museums in Western Macedonia
Populated places in Florina (regional unit)